The Kegler-Gonner Store and Post Office, also known simply as Gonner's Store, is a historic commercial building located in Springbrook, Iowa, United States.  Christian Kegler had the western portion of this building constructed for his general store about 1874.  The post office had relocated here two years previous with Kegler as the postmaster.  Three additions were built on to the original structure.  The building was in its final form by 1933. In 1904 John Gonner bought a stake in the store and by 1908 he owned it entirely. It was still known as Gonner's Store at least into the mid-1980s. A restaurant now occupies the area. Apartments are located on the second floor. The east side of the second level was once used as a boarding house.

The building is composed of coursed ashlar limestone, with the stones themselves being of various sizes.  The tin cornice that caps the main facade features finials, brackets, dentils, and modillion trims. A balcony and a tin awning runs the entire front of the building.  The western portion of the building is capped by a hip roof, while the eastern section is capped with a gable roof.  Local stonemasons Peter and John Weis were believed to have constructed the original structure.  It was listed on the National Register of Historic Places in 1985.

See also 
List of United States post offices

References 

Commercial buildings completed in 1874
Vernacular architecture in Iowa
Commercial buildings on the National Register of Historic Places in Iowa
Post office buildings on the National Register of Historic Places in Iowa
National Register of Historic Places in Jackson County, Iowa
Buildings and structures in Jackson County, Iowa
1874 establishments in Iowa